This list of aircraft carriers contains aircraft carriers listed alphabetically by name. An aircraft carrier is a warship with a full-length flight deck and facilities for carrying, arming, deploying, and recovering aircraft, that serves as a seagoing airbase.

Included in this list are ships which meet the above definition and had an official name (italicized) or designation (non-italicized), regardless of whether they were or were not ordered, laid down, completed, or commissioned.

Not included in this list are the following:

 Aircraft cruisers, also known as aviation cruisers, cruiser-carriers, flight deck cruisers, and hybrid battleship-carriers, which combine the characteristics of aircraft carriers and surface warfare ships, because they primarily operated helicopters or floatplanes and did not act as a floating airbase. Examples include the British s, Japanese s, French cruiser , Soviet s, and Italian s. Vessels which meet the criteria of an aircraft carrier but are named as cruisers (or destroyers, etc.) for political or treaty reasons such as the Russian s or British s are included however.
 Amphibious assault ships, also known as commando carriers, assault carriers, helicopter carriers, landing helicopter assault ships, landing helicopter docks, landing platform docks, and landing platform helicopters. Although they have flight decks and look like aircraft carriers, they primarily operate helicopters and do not act as a floating airbase. Examples include the US Wasp-class assault ships, Brazilian NAM Atlântico (A140), Japanese  escort carrier, and French .
 Catapult aircraft merchantmen, merchant ships which carried cargo and an aircraft catapult (no flight deck).
 Escort carriers, usually converted merchant ships, see separate List of escort carriers by country.
 Merchant aircraft carriers, cargo-carrying merchant ships with a full flight deck.
 Seaplane tenders and seaplane carriers, because they could not land aircraft.
 Submarine aircraft carriers, because they had no flight deck and could not land their aircraft.

"In commission" denotes the period that the ship was officially in commission with the given name for the given country as an aircraft carrier as defined above.

Numbers of aircraft carriers by country

List of countries that have operated aircraft carriers

Argentina
Retired:
 Light carriers:
 ARA Independencia (V-1):  Colossus class light carrier, ex-HMS Warrior, in service from 1959 to 1969; scrapped 1971
 :  Colossus class light carrier, ex-HMS Venerable, in service from 1969 to 1999; scrapped 1999

Australia
Active:

 HMAS Canberra, Canberra-class landing helicopter dock helicopter carrier, also designed to be used to launch fixed wing aircraft. In service since 2011
 HMAS Adelaide, Canberra-class landing helicopter dock helicopter carrier, also designed to be used to launch fixed wing aircraft. In service since 2012

Retired:
 Light fleet carriers:
 : Majestic class carrier in service from 1948 to 1958. Later recommissioned as troop transport
 :  Majestic class carrier in service from 1955 to 1982
 :  Colossus class light carrier on loan from Royal Navy from 1952 to 1955

Brazil
Active:
 : helicopter carrier in service since 2018

Retired:
 Fleet carrier:
 :  carrier in service between 2000 and 2017. Former name as carrier of the French Navy: Foch. Scuttled in 2023
 Light carrier:
 :  Colossus-class carrier, ex-HMS Vengeance, in service from 1960 to 2001

Canada
Retired:
 Light carriers:
 HMCS Warrior:  Colossus-class light carrier in service from 1946 to 1948; returned to Royal Navy and sold to Argentine Navy as ARA Independencia (V-1); carrier in service from 1959 to 1969; scrapped 1971
 :  Majestic-class carrier in service from 1946 to 1956; returned to Royal Navy and stricken; scrapped in Scotland in 1965
  :  Majestic-class carrier in service from 1957 to 1970; ordered by Royal Navy, but sold as HMS Powerful and delivered to Royal Canadian Navy; retired by the Canadian Armed Forces and broken up in Taiwan 1971

China

Active:
 :  partially completed ex-Soviet Navy carrier sold to China by Ukraine and refitted in Dalian as Type 001. Handed over to PLAN on 23 September 2012 and entered active service on 25 September 2012.
 : construction started in 2013, launched in 2017, and entered active service on 17 December 2019.

Under construction:
 Fujian: Type 003 carrier. Launched 17 June 2022. Expected to enter service in 2023.
Planned:
 Type 004: a planned nuclear-powered aircraft carrier.

France
Active:
 : nuclear-powered aircraft carrier in service since 2001

Planned:
 PANG: a planned nuclear-powered aircraft carrier

Retired:
 : converted  in service from 1927 to 1948
 : , ex-, in service from 1945 to 1951
 :  Colossus-class light aircraft carrier, ex-HMS Colossus (R15), in service from 1946 to 1974
 
 : light aircraft carrier in service from 1951 to 1963
 : light aircraft carrier in service from 1953 to 1960
 
 : aircraft carrier in service from 1961 to 1997
 : aircraft carrier in service from 1963 to 2000. Refitted, sold to Brazil and renamed São Paulo. Scuttled in 2023

Never completed:
 : Friponne-class sloop planned for conversion but not completed
 : Valliante-class sloop planned for conversion but not completed
 
 : carrier construction cancelled in 1940
 : carrier plan cancelled in 1940
 : attack carrier development cancelled in 1961
 PH 75: projected two nuclear powered helicopter carrier program during the 1970s
 Bretagne: STOVL aircraft carrier
 Provence: STOVL aircraft carrier
 PA 2: modified version of Thales UK/BMT design for the future British Queen Elizabeth class (formerly CVF).

Germany

Never completed:
   – planned conversion of passenger ship from German shipyard to aircraft carrier. Cancelled in 1918.
 : Graf Zeppelin-class carrier. Launched but not completed. Construction work stopped in 1943.
 Flugzeugträger B:  Graf Zeppelin class carrier cancelled partly constructed in 1939.
 : conversion of part-built Admiral Hipper-class cruiser. Work stopped in 1943 and not resumed.
 : conversion of the transport ship  cancelled at design stage in November 1942 due to insurmountable problems.

India
Active:
 : 45,400 tons, Modified  carrier (ex-), in service with India since 2013.

 : 45,000 ton carrier. It was built at Cochin Shipyard and commissioned on September 2nd 2022. 

Planned:
 : 65,000 ton carrier. Yet to start, planned to enter service in 2030. It will be conventionally powered.

Retired:
 : 19,500 tons, Majestic-class carrier, (ex-HMS Hercules), in service from 1961 to 1997, used as a museum until 2012, scrapped 2014–2015.
 : 28,700 tons,  carrier (ex-) in service from 1987 to 2016. Decommissioned on 6 March 2017.

Italy
Active:
  (2008) – current fleet flagship.
  (1985) – active.

Under construction:
  : 32,300 tons carrier. Construction began in 2017 at Fincantieri Shipyard and is expected to enter service in 2023.

Never completed:
  (1927) (converted liner Augustus, not completed as carrier) – Sunk 5 October 1944
  (1926) (converted liner Roma) – BU 1951–1952

Japan
Active:
 
  – Commissioned in 2015. Announced in December 2018 to be redesignated and converted into multi-purpose destroyer to carry F-35 aircraft
  – Commissioned in 2017. Announced in December 2018 to be redesignated and converted into multi-purpose destroyer to carry F-35 aircraft

Retired:
  (1921) – used as transport to repatriate Japanese troops postwar and dismantled 1946
  (1933) – damaged at Kure by U.S. air raid March 1945 and dismantled 1946
 
  (1939) – damaged during Battle of Philippine Sea, June 1944. Never repaired; dismantled 1946
 
  (1944) – used as transport to repatriate Japanese troops postwar and dismantled 1946

Sunk:
  (1921) – sunk, Battle of Midway, June 1942
 
  (1925) – sunk, Battle of Midway, June 1942
  (1931) – sunk, Battle of the Eastern Solomons, August 1942

  (1935) – sunk, Battle of Midway, June 1942
  (1937) – sunk, Battle of Midway, June 1942
 
  (1935) – sunk, Battle of the Coral Sea, May 1942
  (1936) – sunk, Battle of Leyte Gulf, October 1944
 
  (1936) – seaplane tender from 1934 to 1942, rebuilt as light carrier and sunk at Battle of Leyte Gulf in October 1944
  (1937) – sunk at Battle of Leyte Gulf, October 1944
 
  (1939) – sunk by U.S. submarine , Battle of Philippine Sea, June 1944
  (1939) – sunk, Battle of Leyte Gulf, October 1944
 
  (1939) – sunk, Battle of Philippine Sea, June 1944
  (1943) – sunk, Battle of Philippine Sea, June 1944
 
  (1941) – sunk by U.S. submarine , August 1944
  (1942) – sunk by U.S. submarine , September 1944
  (1942) – sunk by U.S. submarine , December 1943
 
  (1943) – used as anti-aircraft platform and sunk in July 1945
  (1943) – sunk by U.S. submarine , December 1944
  (1944) – sunk by U.S. submarine , November 1944

Hōshō, Jun'yō, Katsuragi, and Ryūhō survived the war. These were scrapped by 1948.

Never completed:
 
Amagi (not completed); damaged beyond economical repair in the Great Kantō earthquake of September 1923, scrapped 1924
 
 5x Improved , project G-15 (cancelled 1944)
 
 Hull 5002, 3rd unit of Unryū class (cancelled 1943); materials used for Shinano conversion
 , 5th unit of Unryū class (not completed); dismantled post-war
 Hull 5005, 6th unit of Unryū class (cancelled 1943); materials used for Shinano conversion
 , 7th unit of Unryū class (not completed); sunk as weapon test target and scrapped postwar
 , 8th unit of Unryū class (not completed); dismantled post-war
 Kurama, 9th unit of Unryū class (cancelled 1944)
  – heavy cruiser conversion (not completed); dismantled post-war

Netherlands
Retired:
 Hr.Ms. Karel Doorman (ex-British , purchased 1948) – Sold to Argentina 1968 and renamed ARA Veinticinco de Mayo, broken up
 Hr.Ms. Karel Doorman (ex-British , transferred to Dutch service 1946) – Converted to merchantman and renamed Port Victor, Until March 1968, owned by Cunard Line but managed by Blue Star Port Lines. Eventually owned by Port Line, 21 July 1971, sent to Faslane to be scrapped
 Rapana class:
 Motor vessel Gadila of the Dutch Merchant Navy was a converted Royal Dutch Shell oil tanker along with her sister ship MV Macoma. 
 Motor vessel Macoma together with MV Gadila were the first Dutch aircraft carriers.

Russia (& USSR)

The Russian Navy was established in December 1991, after the dissolution of the Soviet Union (USSR), most Soviet aircraft carriers were transferred over to Russia (with the exception of Varyag which was transferred to Ukraine. Ulyanovsk was scrapped before the Soviet Union was dissolved).

Active:
 
  (Russia: 1991–present / USSR:  1985-1991)

Retired:
 
  (Russia: 1991–1993, USSR: 1972-1991); converted to a theme park (later hotel) in China
  (Russia: 1991–1993, USSR: 1975-1991); converted to a theme park in China
  (Russia: 1991–1993, USSR: 1978-1991); scrapped
  (Russia: 1991–1995, USSR: 1982-1991); sold to India, modified, rebuilt by India and renamed 

Never completed:
 
 Varyag (not commissioned) — to Ukraine (1991); rebuilt, tested and commissioned by the Chinese PLAN as Liaoning
 Ulyanovsk class
  (not commissioned) — scrapped (1991)

Spain
Active:
  : 27,079 tonne STOVL carrier in active service, commissioned 30 September 2010.

Retired:
 : 11,700 ton  light carrier, ex-, helicopters only from 1967 to 1976, struck 1989 and returned to United States, eventually scrapped in 2002.
 : 17,000 ton STOVL commissioned 30 May 1982, decommissioned on 6 February 2013 due to defence spending cuts.

Never completed:
 Spanish conversion for refloated Italian heavy cruiser Trieste, cancelled in 1951.

Thailand
Role changed:
  (1996)* Commissioned in 1997, but by 1999, only one used AV-8S Matador/Harrier was still operable due to lack of spare parts and age. Since 2006 is solely operated as a helicopter carrier.

Turkey
Active:
  (2021) Construction works began on 30 April 2016 at the shipyard of Sedef Shipbuilding Inc. in Istanbul. It was delivered to Turkish Navy in January 2023.

United Kingdom

Active:
 , STOVL ship of 65,000 tonnes
 
 

Retired:
  (1916) - scrapped 1946
  (1916) - decommissioned 1945
  (1918) – converted to aircraft carrying cruiser 1925, sold for scrap 1946
  fleet maintenance carrier (1943) - sold for scrap 1959
 
  (1939)
  (1939)
  (1939)
  (1940)
 
  (1942)
  (1942)
 
  (ex-Audacious) (1946) - decommissioned 1972
  (ex-Irresistible) (1950) - decommissioned 1979
 Colossus class
  (1943), to France 1946 as 
  (1943)
  (1944)
  (1944)
  (1944)
  (1944) – to Brazil 1956 as 
  (1944) – to Canada 1946–1948, to Argentina 1958 as 
  (1944)
  (1944)
 Majestic class
  (1945) – to Australia 1955 as  
  (1945) – to India 1957 as 
 HMS Magnificent (1944) – sold to Canada as 
  (1945) – to Canada 1952 as 
  (1944) – to Australia in 1948 as  
 
  (1947)
  (1947)
  (1948)
  (ex-Elephant) (1953), to India 1986 as 
 
  (1977)
  (1982)
  (1985)

Sunk:
 Glorious class
  (1916), sunk by Scharnhorst and Gneisenau 8 June 1940
  (1916), sunk by U-29 17 September 1939
  (1918), sunk by U-73 11 August 1942
  (1923) – first purpose-designed aircraft carrier, sunk by Japanese aircraft 9 April 1942
  (1938), sunk 14 November 1941 after being torpedoed by U-81 on 13 November 1941

Never completed:

 
 Eagle – cancelled 1946
 Africa –  to Malta class then cancelled
 Majestic class
  (1945) – was never completed
  - second batch of four cancelled
 Hermes – cancelled
 Arrogant – cancelled
 Monmouth – cancelled
 Polyphemus – cancelled
  – ordered 1943, not laid down, cancelled 1945 
Malta
New Zealand
Gibraltar
Africa
 CVA-01 – cancelled 1966
Initial four ships planned, reduced to two (likely to have been named Queen Elizabeth and Duke of Edinburgh), reduced to one ship in 1963. No building started.

United States

The United States Navy is a blue-water navy that is the world's largest and most powerful because, among its numerous other vessels, it has the world's largest fleet of nuclear powered aircraft carriers. The carrier fleet currently comprises the (CATOBAR)  and (CATOBAR/ EMALS)  supercarriers. These carriers serve as the centerpieces and flagships for the Navy's Carrier Strike Groups, with their embarked carrier air wings and accompanying ships and submarines, which strongly contribute to the US ability to project force around the globe. The following is a complete list of all the US Navy's carriers and classes to date, and their status:

Active
 
  
 
 
 
 
 
 
 
 
 
  
 

Under construction
 
 
 
 

Planned
  
 CVN-82 (ordered)
 CVN-83 (planned)
 CVN-84 (planned)
 CVN-85 (planned)
 CVN-86 (planned)
 CVN-87 (planned)

Reserve
 (none currently in reserve)

Retired (preserved as museum ships)
  
  – (Charleston, South Carolina)
  – (New York City, New York)
  – (Alameda, California)
  – (Corpus Christi, Texas)
 
  – (San Diego, California)

Retired (other)                                    
 
  - (awaiting dismantling)
  - (awaiting dismantling)

Retired (scrapped)
 
 
 
 
  (‡ extended bow)
 
 
  ‡
  ‡
 
 
  ‡
 
  ‡
 
  ‡
  ‡
  ‡
  ‡
  ‡
  ‡
  ‡
  ‡
  ‡
 
 
 
 
 
 
 
 
 
 
 
 
 
 
 
 
 
 
 
 
 
 
 

Sunk († scuttled)
 
  †
 
  
  
 
  
  
 
  †
  (‡ extended bow)
  ‡ †
 
  †
 
 
  †

Cancelled before completion
  (‡ extended bow)
  ‡
  ‡
 No name assigned (CV-50)
 No name assigned (CV-51)
 No name assigned (CV-52)
 No name assigned (CV-53)
 No name assigned (CV-54)
 No name assigned (CV-55)
 
 No name assigned (CV-44)
 No name assigned (CVB-56)
 No name assigned (CVB-57)
 
 

Escort aircraft carrier

The United States Navy also had a sizable fleet of escort aircraft carriers during World War II and the era that followed. These ships were both quicker and cheaper to build than larger fleet carriers and were built in great numbers to serve as a stop-gap measure when fleet carriers were too few. However, they were usually too slow to keep up with naval task forces and would typically be assigned to amphibious operations, often seen in the Pacific war's island hopping campaign, or to convoy protection in the war in the Atlantic. To that end, many of these ships were transferred to the Royal Navy as part of the US-UK lend-lease program. While some of these ships were kept for a time in reserve after the war, none survive today, as they have all since been sunk or retired and scrapped. The following are the classes and stand-alone ships of the US Navy's escort carriers;
  (45 ships, 33 went to the RN)
  (4 ships)
  (50 ships)
  (19 ships went into service, 4 were cancelled)
 Stand-alone ships;
 No USN name given (AVG-1/BAVG-1) – went to the RN as HMS Archer (D78) 
 No USN name given (AVG-2/BAVG-2) – went to the RN as HMS Avenger (D14) 
 No USN name given (AVG-3/BAVG-3) – went to the RN as HMS Biter (D97), then later to the French Navy as Dixmude 
 No USN name given (AVG-4/BAVG-4) – went to the RN as HMS Charger (D27), later returned to USN as  
 No USN name given (AVG-5/BAVG-5) – went to the RN as HMS Dasher (D37) 
 No USN name given (BAVG-6) – went to the RN as HMS Tracker (D24) 
 

Amphibious assault ship

The United States Navy also has several full-deck, amphibious assault ships, which are larger than many of the aircraft carriers of other navies today. These ships are STOVL-capable and can carry full squadrons of fixed-wing aircraft, such as the V/STOL AV-8B Harrier II and the STOVL F-35 Lightning II, along with numerous rotary-wing aircraft. Their primary purpose though, is usually to serve as the centerpiece and flagship for an Expeditionary Strike Group or Amphibious Ready Group, carrying US Marine Corps Expeditionary Units and their equipment close to shore for amphibious landings and departures. The following are ships and classes of US Navy amphibious assault ships;

Active
  (LHD) (843 ft, 40,500 tons) 
 
 
 
 
 
 
 
  (LHA) (844 ft, 45,000 tons)
 
 

Under construction
 
 

Planned 
  (11 total)
 LHA-9 (ordered)
 LHA-10 (ordered)
 LHA-11 (planned)
 LHA-12 (planned)
 LHA-13 (planned)
 LHA-14 (planned)
 LHA-15 (planned)
 LHA-16 (planned)

Retired
 
  
  (LHA)
  – (On donation hold)
  
  
  – (On donation hold)
  – (In Reserve)
  (LPH)
  
  
  
  
  – (Converted to missile trial platform with the National Defense Reserve Fleet in 2006, scrapped in 2018)
  
    
 Stand-alone amphibious assault ships (all LPH, numbered in with the Iwo Jima class);
  – (converted Commencement Bay-class escort carrier)
  – (converted Essex-class aircraft carrier)
  – (converted Essex-class aircraft carrier) 
  – (converted Casablanca-class escort carrier)
  – (converted Essex-class aircraft carrier)

List of all aircraft carriers

See also

 Aircraft carrier
 List of aircraft carriers in service
 List of aircraft carriers by configuration
 List of sunken aircraft carriers
 List of Canadian aircraft carriers
 List of aircraft carriers of the People's Liberation Army Navy 
 List of current French aircraft carriers
 List of German aircraft carriers
 List of aircraft carriers of the Indian Navy
 List of Italian aircraft carriers
 List of aircraft carriers of the Japanese Navy
 List of active Japan Maritime Self-Defense Force ships
 List of aircraft carriers of Russia and the Soviet Union
 List of active Spanish aircraft carriers
 List of aircraft carriers of the Royal Navy
 List of seaplane carriers of the Royal Navy
 List of escort carriers of the Royal Navy
 List of aircraft carriers of the United States Navy
 List of aircraft carrier classes of the United States Navy
 List of escort aircraft carriers of the United States Navy
 List of amphibious warfare ships
 List of carrier-based aircraft
 Timeline for aircraft carrier service

References
 Data for Japanese carriers from:

Notes

Citations

Bibliography
 
 
 Warrilow, Betty. Nabob, the first Canadian-manned aircraft carrier Owen Sound, Ont. : Escort carriers Association, 1989.

Further reading
 Warrilow, Betty. Nabob, the first Canadian-manned aircraft carrier Owen Sound, Ont. : Escort Carriers Association, 1989.
 Chesneau, Roger. Aircraft Carriers of the World, 1914 to the Present.  An Illustrated Encyclopedia Annapolis, Maryland: Naval Institute Press.  

 
 
 
Air